Tiina Sofia Salmén (born 3 August 1984) is a Finnish former football midfielder, who last played for Klepp IL in Norway's Toppserien. She previously played for HJK Helsinki in Finland's Naisten Liiga and Amazon Grimstad in the Toppserien.

As a member of the Finnish national team, she took part in the 2005 and 2009 European Championships. In 2007, she was named Finnish Women's Player of the Year.

After the 2011 Toppserien season, Salmén and compatriot Miia Niemi both left Klepp and retired from football.

References

External links

Profile at Football Association of Finland 

1984 births
Living people
Finnish women's footballers
Expatriate women's footballers in Norway
Finland women's international footballers
Finnish expatriate footballers
Helsingin Jalkapalloklubi (women) players
Kansallinen Liiga players
Finnish expatriate sportspeople in Norway
Toppserien players
Women's association football midfielders